Osman bin Mohd Yusoff (born 17 March 1994) is a Malaysian professional footballer who plays as a centre-back for Kelantan in Malaysia Premier League.

Club career
Osman is a graduate of the Kedah Darul Aman youth system where he played for under-21 team.

Negeri Sembilan
On 2 June 2018, Osman signed a contract with Negeri Sembilan.

On 15 December 2020, Osman joined Negeri Sembilan for a second stint.

International career
Osman has represented Malaysia at under-16 and under-22 levels. He was a member of the under-16 squad at 2010 AFC U-16 Championship qualification.

Career statistics

Honours

Club
Kedah Darul Aman
 Malaysia FA Cup: 2017
 Malaysia Cup: 2016

References

External links
 

1994 births
Living people
People from Kedah
Malaysian footballers
Malaysia Premier League players
Malaysia Super League players
Kedah Darul Aman F.C. players
Negeri Sembilan FA players
Felda United F.C. players
Malaysia youth international footballers
Association football defenders